Austad is a village in Lyngdal municipality in Agder county, Norway. The village is on the eastern shore of the Rosfjorden. Austad Church is located in the center of the village. The village was the administrative centre of the old municipality of Austad which existed from 1909 until 1963. In the Rockstar produced game, “Red Dead Redemption 2”, Austad is referenced on a newspaper scrap found on one of the settlers of Manzanita Post.

Name
The village is named after the old Austad farm (Old Norse: Alvisstaðir).  The first element of the name is derived from the male name "Ålvir" and the last element is "stad" (Old Norse: staðir) which means "homestead" or "farm".

References

Lyngdal
Villages in Agder